The Premio Campiello is an annual Italian literary prize. 

A Jury of Literary Experts (Giuria di letterati in Italian) identifies books published during the year and, in a public hearing, selects five of those as finalists.  These books are called Premio Selezione Campiello.  Then a jury of 300 readers (called Giuria dei 300 lettori) representing different social, cultural and professional groups from each region of Italy, each with one vote, decides the winner of the selection.
Since 2004, the Jury of Literary Experts awards a Premio Campiello Opera Prima for the best debut.

History 
In 1962 Confindustria Veneto was seeking a contact between business and the literary sector and decided to formulate a literary prize.   The first award was given to Primo Levi for his autobiographical book La tregua, translated in Britain as The Truce and in the United States as Reawakening.  The ceremony took place in Venice's Teatro Verde on the island of San Giorgio Maggiore on 3 September 1963.

Today, the prize is still promoted by Italian businessmen from the Veneto region and it serves to promote Italian literature.  

There is a literary prize for young authors, called Campiello Giovani.  Participants must prove that they are between 15 and 22 years of age to qualify.  The committee that determines the Campiello Giovani is made up of young people.  Very often previous winners and finalists serve on the initial jury to determine the current participants.  Then, three teachers vote for the five finalists, and the Jury of 300 select the winner.

Some foreign countries, like Germany and Spain, have begun to award a prize called Campiello using the same model.

Name 
The word campiello is the diminutive of campo.  Unlike other cities that use the word piazza to designate plazas and squares, Venice uses the word campo.  Campiello is a little square.

Winners

Premio Speciale
From 1997 to 2003 Fondazione Il Campiello awarded a special prize (Premio Speciale della Giuria dei Letterati) which recognized contemporary writers for distinguished work throughout their lifetime.  The Premio Speciale was awarded to:
Anna Maria Ortese (1997)
Elio Pagliarani (1998)
Maria Corti (1999)
Franco Lucentini (2000)
Raffaele La Capria (2001)
Michel Tournier (2002)
Edoardo Sanguineti (2003)

References

External links 

  .

Campiello
Fiction awards
Awards established in 1963
1963 establishments in Italy